Grevillea glabrescens is a species of flowering plant in the family Proteaceae and is endemic to the Northern Territory. It is an open, erect shrub with oblong leaves that have triangular teeth or lobes on the edges, and clusters of white to cream-coloured or very pale yellow flowers.

Description

Taxonomy
Grevillea glabrescens was first formally described in 1993 by Peter M. Olde and Neil R. Marriott in the journal Telopea from specimens collected near El Sharana in Kakadu National Park in 1990. The specific epithet (glabrescens) means "becoming glabrous", referring to the leaves and branchlets.

Distribution and habitat
This grevillea grows in low heath in shallow sandy soil and in rock crevices at or near the top of escarpments in Kakadu and Nitmiluk National Parks.

Conservation status
Grevillea glabrescens is listed as of "least concern" under the Northern Territory Government Territory Parks and Wildlife Conservation Act 1976.

References

glabrescens
Proteales of Australia
Plants described in 1993
Flora of the Northern Territory